Droneman is a 2020 Czech psychological thriller film directed by Petr Zelenka. It stars Kryštof Hádek and Jiří Mádl.

Plot
Droneman is about chemist and fly navigator Pavel and his friend businessman and free time rapper Plech. Pavel has strong sense of justice and wishes to fix wrongs with the world while Plech dreams about big money and secure life. Their common passion are drones since school. Pavel returns from abroad and meets again with Plech and together they use drones to start a business. They monitor Power Stations, wear luxury handbags at the show or spray the Petřín Tower from the air. Their clients even include Presidential candidate. Everything changes when one of them decides to misuse drones. Pavel is involved in activism against torture at Guantanamo Bay and believes that Supreme American politicians should be judged for it. It gets him into conflict with more rational Plech and other people. Starts to lose his illusion and decides to commit an assault of American Vice President Dick Cheney during his visit of Prague in 2000. He decides to use a drone during the assassination, but during the act he is unable to kill Cheney and gets killed by the Police.

Cast
 Kryštof Hádek as Pavel
 Jiří Mádl as Plech
 Veronika Khek Kubařová as Eva
 Zuzana Fialová as Jana
 Richard Stanke as Jan Zavadil
 Helena Dvořáková as Petra
 Miroslav Hanuš as Kasl
 Jiří Štrébl as Aleš
 Kristýna Frejová as Lenka
Jan Vondráček as Dick Cheney

References

External links
 
 Droneman at CSFD.cz 

2020 films
2020 psychological thriller films
Cultural depictions of Dick Cheney
Czech political thriller films
Czech thriller drama films
Czech thriller films
2020s Czech-language films
Drone films
Films about assassinations
Films directed by Petr Zelenka
Films set in Prague
Czech psychological films